Yeretsky is a rural locality (a khutor) in Avilovskoye Rural Settlement, Ilovlinsky District, Volgograd Oblast, Russia. The population was 24 as of 2010.

Geography 
Yeretsky is located on the bank of the Koldair Lake, 17 km southwest of Ilovlya (the district's administrative centre) by road. Beluzhino-Koldairov is the nearest rural locality.

References 

Rural localities in Ilovlinsky District